In the 1993 Cameroonian Premier League season, 16 teams competed. Racing Bafoussam won the championship.

League standings

References
Cameroon - List of final tables (RSSSF)

Cam
Cam
1
Elite One seasons